German Haitians are Haitians of German descent or Germans with Haitian citizenship.

History
The earliest known German settlement in Saint-Domingue was in Bombardopolis, south of the Môle-Saint-Nicolas. About a thousand Germans came to Bombardopolis, invited by France, in the eighteenth century and managed to make a living in agriculture. That first wave of Germans, having been permitted to settle in one of the least fertile part of Haiti left the island for Guyana, and Louisiana. A second group of Germans were the soldiers who came with the French Leclerc expedition.

Starting in the mid 1800 Germans started to settle and instigate commercial relations with Haïti. Germany having no colonies in the Caribbean found a country open to foreign trade, with limited competition from other nations. The German community was willing to integrate into Haitian society. Some Germans married into Haiti's most prominent families. This enabled them to bypass the constitutional prohibition against foreigners owning land.
In 1910, Haitian Germans controlled 80% of Haiti's International Commerce. Though German Haitians only numbered about 200, they wielded a disproportionate amount of economic power. For example, they owned and operated utilities in Port-au-Prince and Cap-Haïtien but also controlled the Port-au-Prince main wharf. 

When the US invaded Haiti in 1915, they promptly jailed and confiscated all Germans and their possessions. This was one of their primary goals. During the First World War (1914-1918), when the US entered the war, Germans still in Haïti were jailed in Fort Nationale under US soldiers guard. At the end of the First World War most Germans left Haïti, never to return due to the hostility of the American occupying force. The Germans who stayed were the ones who had created family ties on the island. The US never returned the confiscated German belongings.
In 1940 during the Second World War, when Haïti declared war on Germany, again all German properties were confiscated, the Haitians later passed a law to return them to their rightful owner. German Haitians who kept their German citizenship were imprisoned. In 1942 these German war prisoners were sent to the US, at American request, as guarantee for the US prisoners held in Germany. Only in 1946, when Dumarsais Estimé became president, did Haiti allow these German prisoners in jail at that time on Ellis island NY, to return to Haiti. It has been reported that the German/Haitian prisoners were offered American citizenship but rejected this, preferring to be sent back to Haiti.

Notable German Haitians
  

 Joe Gaetjens, soccer player for the United States national team in the 1950 FIFA World Cup
 Werner Jaegerhuber, composer
 Philippe Kieffer, Free French Forces hero (Alsatian descent)
 TiCorn (born Cornelia Schütt), folk singer and songwriter

See also

 United States occupation of Haiti

References

 http://www.touthaiti.com/culture-loisirs/4559-bombardopolis-cite-nee-d-une-altercation-franco-allemande
Bombardopolis history and German population.

http://faculty.webster.edu/corbetre/haiti/history/earlyhaiti/1805-const.htm
The 1805 Constitution of Haïti promulgated by Dessalines. Article 13 granting citizenship to Germans.

 https://journals.openedition.org/plc/298
Germany Pre-WW1 politics in the Caribbean region.

 https://bahamianology.com/haiti-declares-war-on-germany-after-eight-haitians-killed-on-french-steamer-by-german-torpedo-1918/
Haïti declares war to Germany, while under occupation.

 https://www.thc.texas.gov/preserve/projects-and-programs/military-history/texas-world-war-ii/japanese-german-and-italian
World War 2 German prisoners of war from the Caribbean and Haïti.
“There were Latin American and U.S. businessmen who begrudged the success of Japanese, German, and Italian nationals and the war provided an opportunity to remove this source of competition.”

Titus, Rubens F. (Rene Preval Haiti Archives Online)

Ethnic groups in Haiti
European Haitian
 
German Caribbean
Haiti